Keith George Wilson (19 September 1941 – 6 July 2011) was a British production designer. He began his career at AP Films, working as an art assistant on Fireball XL5 (1963) and later Gerry Anderson productions. He created sets for Space: 1999 (1975–77) and Star Maidens (1976).

Wilson died on 6 July 2011.

Awards
Wilson won an Emmy for Outstanding Individual Achievement in Art Direction for a Miniseries or a Special for the TV film Stalin (1992) and was nominated for Outstanding Art Direction for a Miniseries or a Special for Great Expectations (1989). He also received a CableACE Award for Art Direction in a Dramatic Special or Series/Movie or Miniseries for The Old Curiosity Shop (1995).

Filmography
 The Hills Have Eyes II (2007)
 The Ten Commandments (2007)
 A Christmas Carol (TV film, 2004)
 The Blackwater Lightship (TV film, 2004)
 Dinotopia (TV mini-series, 2002)
 Victoria & Albert (TV mini-series, 2001)
 In the Beginning (TV mini-series, 2000)
 Mary, Mother of Jesus (TV film, 1999)
 The Seventh Scroll (TV mini-series, 1999)
 Miracle at Midnight (TV film, 1998)
 Oliver Twist (TV film, 1997)
 The Apocalypse Watch (TV film, 1997)
 Supply & Demand (TV series, 1997)
 The Little Riders (TV film, 1996)
 The Governor (TV series, 1995)
 The Old Curiosity Shop (TV series, 1995)
 Remember (TV series, 1993)
 Stalin (TV film, 1992)
 Fergie & Andrew: Behind the Palace Doors (TV series, 1992)
 L'Amérique en otage (TV series, 1991)
 Great Expectations (TV mini-series, 1989)
 The Lady and the Highwayman (TV film, 1989)
 Steal the Sky (TV series, 1988)
 A Hazard of Hearts (TV film, 1987)
 The Lion of Africa (TV series, 1987)
 Gulag (TV film, 1985)
 Out of the Darkness (TV film, 1985)
 Exploits at West Poley (TV series, 1985)
 Haunters of the Deep (1984)
 Slayground (1983)
 Memoirs of a Survivor (1981)
 Riding High (1981)
 Yesterday's Hero (1979)
 A Man Called Intrepid (TV mini-series, 1979)
 International Velvet (1978)
 Space: 1999 (TV series, 48 episodes, 1975–78)
 The New Avengers (TV series, six episodes, 1977)
 Star Maidens (TV series, 13 episodes, 1976)
 UFO (TV series) (TV series, 26 episodes, 1970)
 The Secret Service (TV series, 1969)
 Captain Scarlet and the Mysterons (TV series, six episodes, 1967)
 Thunderbirds Are Go (1966)

References

External links
 
 
 The Catacombs - Keith Wilson - Comprehensive guide to Space: 1999

1941 births
2011 deaths
British film designers
British production designers
Emmy Award winners
Place of birth missing
Place of death missing